Shahsavaran (also Romanized as Shāhsavārān; also known as Shāhsavār) is a village in Moshkabad Rural District, in the Central District of Arak County, Markazi Province, Iran. At the 2006 census, its population was 864, in 254 families.

References 

Populated places in Arak County